Leucopogon atherolepis is a species of flowering plant in the family Ericaceae and is endemic to the south-west of Western Australia. It is an erect shrub with linear leaves and white, tube-shaped flowers.

Description
Flowering occurs from August to November.

Taxonomy
Leucopogon atherolepis was first formally described in 1859 by Sergei Sergeyevich Sheglejev in the Bulletin de la Société impériale des naturalistes de Moscou. The specific epithet (atherolepis) is derived from Greek words meaning "the point of a weapon" and "a scale", referring to the sharply-pointed bracts, bracteoles and sepals.

Distribution and habitat
This leucopogon grows on rocky hillsides, mainly in the Stirling Range National Park in the Esperance Plains and Mallee bioregions of south-western Western Australia.

Conservation status
Leucopogon atherolepis is listed as "not threatened" by the Government of Western Australia Department of Biodiversity, Conservation and Attractions.

References

 atherolepis
Ericales of Australia
Flora of Western Australia
Plants described in 1859